Hypostomus tapijara is a species of catfish in the family Loricariidae. It is native to South America, where it occurs in the Ribeira de Iguape River basin in Brazil. The species reaches 37.8 cm (14.9 inches) in standard length and is believed to be a facultative air-breather. The morphology and coloration of Hypostomus tapijara can be used to distinguish it from all other Hypostomus species present in the Ribeira de Iguape basin.

References 

tapijara
Fish described in 2005
Fish of South America
Fish of Brazil
Catfish of South America